Krasnoyarskoye is a rural locality (a selo) in the Ozyorsky District in the Kaliningrad Oblast, Russia. Population:

References

Rural localities in Kaliningrad Oblast